Below are all the national cup matches played by FC Zwolle. In the seasons 1954/55, 1955/56 and 1959/60 there was no national cup in the Netherlands. In the season 1966/67 they did not participate. The second place behind FC Twente in 1976/77 is still the best result. The matches are sorted by season. The goalscorers are shown in the right box.

Key 
 Group = Group stage
 R1 = First round
 R2 = Second round
 R3 = Third round
 R4 = Fourth ronde
 1/8 = 1/8 finals
 QF = Quarter-finals
 SF = Semi-finals
 RU = Runners-up
 W = Winners

Cup matches 

PEC Zwolle